Horridipamera is a genus of dirt-colored seed bugs in the family Rhyparochromidae. There are about 13 described species in Horridipamera.

Species
These 13 species belong to the genus Horridipamera:

 Horridipamera bergrothi (Horvath, 1892)
 Horridipamera cantrelli Malipatil, 1978
 Horridipamera compacta Slater & Zheng, 1985
 Horridipamera emersoni (Distant, 1909)
 Horridipamera ferruginosa (Stal, 1874)
 Horridipamera inconspicua (Dallas, 1852)
 Horridipamera lateralis (Scott, 1874)
 Horridipamera medleri Slater & Zheng, 1985
 Horridipamera nietneri (Dohrn, 1860)
 Horridipamera perlongus Scudder, 1971
 Horridipamera pullatus (Hesse, 1925)
 Horridipamera robusta Malipatil, 1978
 Horridipamera subsericeus (Breddin, 1907)

References

External links

 

Rhyparochromidae